Diano railway station is a railway station serving the town of Diano Castello, in Liguria, northwestern Italy. The station is located on the Genoa–Ventimiglia railway and was opened on 11 December 2016. The train services are operated by Trenitalia.

The station was built to replace the former station Diano Marina. The station was opened as part of an 18.8 km new double-track railway between Andora and San Lorenzo which operates largely through tunnels, rather than winding along the coast.

Train services
The station is served by the following service(s):

EuroCity services (Thello) Marseille - Cannes - Nice - Monaco - Ventimiglia - Genoa - Milan
Intercity services Ventimiglia - Savona - Genoa - La Spezia - Pisa - Livorno - Rome
Intercity services Ventimiglia - Savona - Genoa - Milan
Regional services (Treno regionale) Ventimiglia - Savona - Genoa - Sestri Levante - La Spezia - San Stefano di Magra

See also

History of rail transport in Italy
List of railway stations in Liguria
Rail transport in Italy
Railway stations in Italy

References

External links

Province of Imperia
Railway stations in Liguria
Railway stations opened in 2016